Anyphaena californica is a species of ghost spider in the family Anyphaenidae. It is found in the United States.

References

Anyphaenidae
Articles created by Qbugbot
Spiders described in 1904